Antiques Roadshow is a British television series produced by the BBC since 1979. The thirty-second series comprised 30 episodes broadcast from 20 September 2009 to 9 May 2010.

Episodes

References

External links
 Official Website – BBC Antiques Roadshow
 Homes and Antiques, Meet the Experts
 BBC Proposed Episode Filming Locations
 Episode list – TV.com
 Episode list (from series 17) – bbcprograms.com
 Filming Dates – BBC Homes and Antiques
 BBC Restoration Roadshow

32